Positive Vibrations is the eighth studio album by the English blues rock band, Ten Years After, which was released in 1974. Shortly after the release of this album, the band broke up. The album peaked at #81 in the US Billboard 200 chart.

Track listing
All songs written by Alvin Lee, except where noted.

Side one
 "Nowhere to Run" – 4:02
 "Positive Vibrations" – 4:20
 "Stone Me" – 4:57
 "Without You" – 4:00
 "Going Back to Birmingham"  (Little Richard) – 2:39

Side two
 "It's Getting Harder" – 4:24
 "You're Driving Me Crazy" – 2:26
 "Look into My Life" – 4:18
 "Look Me Straight into the Eyes" – 6:20
 "I Wanted to Boogie" – 3:36

2013 remaster additional tracks

 "Rock & Roll Music to the World" (Live in Frankfurt)
 "Once There Was a Time" (Live in Frankfurt)
 "Spoonful" (Live in Paris)
 "I'm Going Home" (Live in Paris)
 "Standing at the Station" (Live in Amsterdam)
 "Sweet Little Sixteen" (Live in Atlanta)
 Positive Vibrations Radio Advert (1974)

Personnel
Ten Years After
Alvin Lee – guitar, vocals, harmonica
Leo Lyons – bass
Ric Lee – drums
Chick Churchill – organ, synthesizer, piano

Charts

References

External links

1974 albums
Ten Years After albums
Chrysalis Records albums
Columbia Records albums